Sokołowo  is a village in the administrative district of Gmina Września, within Września County, Greater Poland Voivodeship, in west-central Poland.

The village existed before 1523. In the past it was owned by the Polish noble Poniński family, including participant of the November Uprising of 1830–1831, .

Poles from the nearby town of Września erected a monument at the site several months later despite Prussian rule.

References

Villages in Września County